The following is a list of county roads in Columbia County, Florida.  All county roads are maintained by the county in which they reside, however not all of them are marked with standard MUTCD approved county road shields.

List of County Roads in Columbia County, Florida

References

General Highway Map; Columbia County, Florida (Florida Department of Transportation)
FDOT GIS data, accessed January 2014

 
County